Sankt Jakob in Defereggen (Southern Bavarian: St. Jakoub in Dejfreggin) is a municipality in the district of Lienz in the Austrian state of Tyrol.

Population

Personalities
Mario Scheiber, skier

References

External links 
 www.stjakob.at - city website

Villgraten Mountains
Cities and towns in Lienz District